Tolna is a genus of moths of the family Erebidae. The genus was erected by Francis Walker in 1869.

Species
Tolna alboapicata Berio, 1956
Tolna atrigona A. E. Prout, 1927
Tolna burdoni Carcasson, 1965
Tolna chionopera (H. Druce, 1912)
Tolna complicata (Butler, 1880)
Tolna cryptoleuca Hampson, 1918
Tolna demaculata Strand, 1913
Tolna hypogrammica Hampson, 1918
Tolna limula (Möschler, 1883)
Tolna macrosema Hampson, 1913
Tolna niveipicta Strand, 1915
Tolna sinifera Hampson, 1913
Tolna strandi (Bryk, 1915)
Tolna sypnoides (Butler, 1878)
Tolna tetrhemicycla Strand, 1913
Tolna variegata (Hampson, 1905)
Tolna versicolor Walker, 1869

References

Erebidae